Yeremeyevo is a rural locality (a village) in Leskovskoye Rural Settlement, Vologodsky District, Vologda Oblast, Russia. The population was 7 as of 2002.

Geography 
The distance to Vologda is 21 km, to Leskovo is 6 km. Yuryevo, Timofeyevskoye, Otradnoye, Yesikovo, Kolkino are the nearest rural localities.

References 

Rural localities in Vologodsky District